The Iowa House of Representatives is the lower house of the Iowa General Assembly, the legislature of the U.S. state of Iowa. One State Representative is elected from each of the state's 100 electoral districts, with each House district making up half of a Senate district. The 2023-25 term is part of the 90th General Assembly.  , 64 of the seats are held by Republicans and 36 by Democrats. The presiding officer is the Speaker of the House, who is chosen by the majority party and elected by the House. In addition, representatives elect a Speaker Pro Tempore, chosen in the same manner as the Speaker, and the respective party caucuses elect a majority and minority leader, a majority and minority whip, and assistant party leaders.

Representatives serve for two-year terms and are elected in the general election on election day, as part of the presidential and midterm elections. Newly elected representatives are sworn in and begin work on the second Monday of January. Should a representative resign from office before his or her term expires, the governor calls a special election to replace the representative. Representatives are not term-limited.

Representatives generally serve on several standing committees and often serve on joint appropriations subcommittees, permanent statutory committees, and various boards and commissions.

Party composition

Current leadership

90th Session State Representatives

Notes

See also
List of current members of the Iowa Senate
Iowa House of Representatives

References
General
 
 
 
 
 
 
Specific

External links
Iowa General Assembly

House